Agonum angustatum is a species of ground beetle in the Platyninae subfamily that can be found in Central and Southern Europe, Asia Minor, Caucasus, Iran and North Africa.

Notes

References

Beetles described in 1828
angustatum
Beetles of Europe